Gregory Lewis (born 9 December 1946 in Victoria) is a former Australian Olympic athlete who competed in the 100 metres and 200 metres.

Achievements
Lewis won six Australian Championships during his career and represented Australia at the 1968 Olympic Games and two Commonwealth Games.  In his final international competition, the 1974 British Commonwealth Games in Christchurch, Lewis won a gold medal as part of the victorious Australian 4 x 100 metres relay team.

Additional information
In 1972, Lewis married Commonwealth Games High jumper Carolyn Wright.  Their daughter Tamsyn Manou is a three-time Olympian, specialising in the 800 metres, who has won three Commonwealth Games relay gold medals and one World Indoor 800m gold medal.

Statistics

Personal Bests

See also
 Australian athletics champions
 Tamsyn Manou
 Carolyn Wright

References

External links
 

1946 births
Living people
Australian male sprinters
Commonwealth Games gold medallists for Australia
Athletes (track and field) at the 1970 British Commonwealth Games
Athletes (track and field) at the 1974 British Commonwealth Games
Olympic athletes of Australia
Athletes (track and field) at the 1968 Summer Olympics
Commonwealth Games medallists in athletics
Universiade medalists in athletics (track and field)
Universiade bronze medalists for Australia
Medallists at the 1974 British Commonwealth Games